RJR-MacDonald Inc v Canada (AG), [1995] 3 S.C.R. 199 is a leading Canadian constitutional decision of the Supreme Court of Canada what upheld the federal Tobacco Products Control Act but struck out the provisions that prevented tobacco advertising and unattributed health warnings.

Background
RJR MacDonald Inc. and Imperial Tobacco challenged the Act as being ultra vires the federal government's criminal law power and peace, order and good government power, and as being in violation of the right to freedom of expression under section 2(b) of the Canadian Charter of Rights and Freedoms.

Reasons of the court
The Court upheld the Act as valid under the criminal law power but found that sections 4, 8, and 9 of the Act violated freedom of expression and could not be saved under section 1 of the Charter. There were four separate opinions given.

Division of powers
The Court found the Act was not colourable. The evil that the law is addressing does not have to be approached directly, and in those circumstances, it would not be practical. Even though the subject was not one that was commonly recognized as being criminal, that does not necessarily invalidate it.

Charter issues
The majority held that the impugned sections violated the freedom of expression under section 2(b) of the Charter. The right to freedom of expression includes the right to say nothing. The mandatory use of unattributed labels was a form of forced expression and so invoked section 2(b).

The majority held that the violation was not upheld under section 1 of the Charter.

See also
 List of Supreme Court of Canada cases (Lamer Court)

External links
 

Canadian Charter of Rights and Freedoms case law
Supreme Court of Canada cases
Canadian federalism case law
Canadian freedom of expression case law
1995 in Canadian case law
Smoking in Canada
Tobacco case law
R. J. Reynolds Tobacco Company
Imperial Brands
Medical lawsuits